Raymond Lynn Kysar, Jr. (born February 15, 1931) was an American politician who was a Republican member of the New Mexico State Senate from 1989 to 2005. He attended New Mexico State University and worked in the construction, insurance, ranching, and real estate industries. He was inducted into the New Mexico State University College of Business Hall of Fame in 1999.

References

1931 births
Living people
People from Hays, Kansas
People from Farmington, New Mexico
New Mexico State University alumni
Republican Party New Mexico state senators